Peter Norburn (31 December 1930 – 6 June 2017) was an English extra (actor), window cleaner and professional rugby league footballer who played in the 1950s and 1960s.

Playing career

International honours
Peter Norburn played right-, i.e. number 12 for English League XIII while at Swinton in the 19-8 victory over France at Headingley, Leeds on Wednesday 16 April 1958, and won a cap playing , i.e. number 2, and scored 4-tries for England while at Swinton in the 30-22 victory over Other Nationalities at Central Park, Wigan on Saturday 28 November 1953, equaling the England national team's record for the most tries by an individual in a match.

Championship appearances
Peter Norburn played in Swinton's victories in the Championship during the 1962-63 season, and the  1963-64 season. These were also the only two seasons between the 1905–06 season, and the 1972–73 season in which a playoff wasn't used to determine the Championship winners.

County league appearances
Peter Norburn played in Swinton's victory in the Lancashire County league during the 1960–61 season.

County Cup Final appearances
Peter Norburn played right-, i.e. number 12, in Swinton's 9-15 defeat by St. Helens in the 1960 Lancashire County Cup Final during the 1960–61 season at Central Park, Wigan on Saturday 29 October 1960, played right- in the 9-25 defeat by St. Helens in the 1961 Lancashire County Cup Final during the 1961–62 season at Central Park, Wigan on Saturday 11 November 1961, and played left-, i.e. number 11, in 4-7 defeat by St. Helens in the 1962 Lancashire County Cup Final during the 1962–63 season at Central Park, Wigan on Saturday 27 October 1962.

Notable tour matches
Peter Norburn played in Swinton's match against Australia during the 1952–53 Kangaroo tour of Great Britain and France, played in the 24-25 defeat by Australia in the 1959–60 Kangaroo tour match at Station Road, Swinton on Wednesday 25 November 1959, and played in the 2-2 draw with Australia in the 1963–64 Kangaroo tour of Great Britain and France match at Station Road, Swinton on Saturday 23 November 1963.

Playing career
Peter Norburn made his début for Swinton against Workington Town on Saturday 26 August 1950, and he played his last match for Swinton in the 10-7 victory over St. Helens at Station Road, Swinton on Monday 30 March 1964.

Outside of rugby league
Peter Norburn was an extra (actor) in television programmes such as; Coronation Street and Z-Cars.

Genealogical information
Peter Norburn's marriage to Marjorie (née Benson) was registered during first ¼ 1953 in Wigan district. They had children; Jayne B. Norburn (birth registered during third ¼  in Barton-upon-Irwell), and Hilary G. Norburn (birth registered during second ¼  in Barton-upon-Irwell). Peter Norburn's funeral took place at Peel Green Crematorium, M30 7LW, at 2.20pm on Thursday 15 June 2017.

References

External links
Championship winning team of 1964
Peter Norburn : Obituary

1930 births
2017 deaths
English male television actors
England national rugby league team players
English rugby league players
Rugby league players from Wigan
Rugby league second-rows
Rugby league wingers
Salford Red Devils players
Swinton Lions players